The Nigerian Bar Association (NBA) is a non-profit, umbrella professional association of all lawyers admitted to the bar in Nigeria. It is engaged in the promotion and protection of human rights, the rule of law and good governance in Nigeria. The NBA has an observer status with the African Commission on Human and People's Rights, and a working partnership with many national and international non-governmental organizations concerned with similar goals in Nigeria and in Africa.

The NBA is made up of 125 branches, three professional sections, two specialized institutes, six practice-cadre forums, and high-level leverage in the political society in Nigeria.

Its National Secretariat is managed from Abuja. Its organizational structure comprises a National Executive Committee, a National Officers/Management Board, sections, forums, committees, working groups and a National Secretariat with a manpower strengthening  of 34 staff as at June 2010.

The current president of the Nigerian Bar Association is Yakubu Maikyau. and the current General Secretary is Adesina Adegbite.

Former chairmen and presidents
Past chairmen of the association were:

 Christopher Sapara Williams (1900–1915)
 Sir Kitoyi Ajasa (1915–1937)
 Eric Olawale Moore (1937–1944)
 E.J. Alex Taylor (1944–1950)
 Sir Adeyemo Alakija (1950–1952)
 Jubril Martin (1952–1959)

Presidents of the Bar Association, who had the same authority as the former Chairmen, were:

 Frederick Rotimi Williams (1960–1968)
 Peter Thomas  (1968–1969)
 Chief B.M. Boyo (1969–1970)
 Chief Richard Akinjide (1970–1973)
 Chief Adebayo Ogunsanya (1973–1974)
 Dr. Mudiaga Odge (1974–1975)
 Dr. Nwakanma Okoro (1976–1978)
 Chief B.O. Benson  (1978–1980)
 Chief Adetunji Fadairo (1980–1982)
 A.N. Anyamene (1982–1984)
Prince Bola Ajibola, (1984–1985)
 Ebele Nwokoye (1985–1987)
Alao Aka-Bashorun (1987–1989)
 Charles Idehen (1989–1991)
Chief Clement Akpamgbo (1991–1992)
 Priscilla Kuye (1991–1992)

Between 1992 and 1998 the NBA had no president, functioning only in branches. After the crisis, presidents were:

 Chief T.J.O. Okpoko, SAN (1998–2000)
O.C.J. Okocha, SAN (2000–2002)
Chief Wole Olanipekun,  SAN (2002–2004)
Chief Bayo Ojo, SAN (2004–2005)
Prince Lanke Odogiyon (2005–2006)
Olisa Agbakoba (2006–2008)
Chief Oluwarotimi Akeredolu, SAN (2008–2010)
Joseph Bodurin Daudu, SAN (2010–2012)
Okey Wali, SAN (2012–2014)

Augustine Alegeh, SAN (2014–2016)
Abubakar Balarabe Mahmoud (AB Mahmoud), SAN (2016–2018)
Paul Usoro, SAN (2018–2020)
Olumide Akpata, (2020–2022)
Yakubu Chonoko Maikyau (2022–present)

See also

 2007 Lagos State indecency crackdown
 Nigerian Body of Benchers

References

Law of Nigeria
1933 establishments in Nigeria
African bar associations
Organizations established in 1933